Alien Nations is a real-time strategy video game developed by Neo Software and published by JoWooD Productions for Microsoft Windows in 1999. It was re-released on GOG.com in 2009. A sequel, The Nations, was published in 2001. Alien Nations was a commercial hit in the German market, and ultimately sold close to 1 million units worldwide.

Gameplay 
Alien Nations is a real-time strategy game based on building a nation and conquering others. The player may choose from 3 races – the Pimmons, the Amazons and the Sajkhi. In single-player mode, there are three gameplay modes: Introduction, Campaigns, and Never-ending Game.

Reception

Sales
Alien Nations was a commercial hit in the German market. Der Spiegels Frank Patalong noted that it was one of the construction and management simulations that "dominated the German sales charts for years", alongside Anno 1602 and the Settlers series. In German-speaking countries, it sold 150,000 units after two months on shelves, according to the game's Russian publisher Snowball Studios. It was also a success in Russia, with sales of 80,000 units by April 2001. Alien Nations ultimately sold "just under a million copies" by 2016, reported Micharl Furtenbach of Red Bull.

Critical reviews
Oleg Hazhinskiy of Game.EXE gave the game 4.1/5 and noted its strong similarities with The Settlers series. Among differences, he praised the marketing system, but also mentioned lacking combat.

See also
Video gaming in Germany

References

External links 
 JoWooD web page for The Nations (archived 2005-10-04)
 
 

1999 video games
Classic Mac OS games
Real-time strategy video games
Rockstar Vienna games
Video games about extraterrestrial life
Video games developed in Austria
Video games scored by Jesper Kyd
Video games set on fictional planets
Windows games
JoWooD Entertainment games